Srihari (15 August 1964 – 9 October 2013) was an Indian actor who was active mainly in Telugu cinema. He appeared in a few Tamil, Kannada and Hindi films as well. He won seven Nandi Awards and one Filmfare Award.

Early life
Srihari was born near Vijayawada, Krishna district, Andhra Pradesh. His parents were from Gudivada. They moved to Hyderabad
and settled in Balanagar, when he was still a child. He started his career as a stunt fighter. He was also an athlete in gymnastics. He was offered jobs such as sub-inspector of police and railway officer, but he rejected those offers because he was interested in pursuing an acting career.

Srihari completed his degree in 1986. He was introduced into movies by Dasari Narayana Rao with a role in the movie Brahma Nayudu (1987).

Personal life
Srihari married South Indian actress Shanti, popularly known as Disco Shanti, in 1996. The couple has two sons and a daughter. Their daughter, Akshara, died when she was just four months old. The family started the Akshara Foundation in her memory, which aims to supply fluoride-free drinking water for three villages he adopted in the Ranga Reddy district. He donated over 50% of his earnings for the cause of this foundation. He also adopted four villages in Medchal.

Death
While shooting for the movie R... Rajkumar, he complained of giddiness and was rushed to Lilavati Hospital. On 9 October 2013, he died in Lilavati Hospital in Mumbai, aged 49, after suffering a liver ailment. He was buried next to his daughter.

Awards and nominations
Filmfare Awards
 Filmfare Best Supporting Actor Award (Telugu) - Nuvvostanante Nenoddantana (2005)

Nandi Awards
Best Villain - Taj Mahal (1995)
Special Jury Award - Sri Ramulayya (1998)
Special Jury Award - Police, Ramasakkanodu (1999)
Special Jury Award - Vijaya Rama Raju (2000)
Best Supporting Actor -  Nuvvostanante Nenoddantana (2005)
Best Film on National Integration - Hanumanthu (2006)

Filmography
Actor

References

1964 births
2013 deaths
Male actors from Andhra Pradesh
Indian male film actors
Male actors in Telugu cinema
Male actors in Tamil cinema
Male actors in Hindi cinema
Male actors in Kannada cinema
People from Krishna district
20th-century Indian male actors
21st-century Indian male actors